John Kodwo Amissah (November 27, 1922 – September 22, 1991) was a Ghanaian prelate of the Catholic Church who served as Archbishop of Cape Coast from 1959 until his death.

Born in Elmina, he was ordained to the priesthood on December 11, 1949. His thesis at St. Peter's College in Rome was on a comparison between canon law and the native customs of marriage.

On March 7, 1957, Amissah was appointed Auxiliary Bishop of Cape Coast and Titular Bishop of Bencenna, receiving his episcopal consecration on the following June 16 from Archbishop William Thomas Porter, SMA. Amissah replaced Porter as Archbishop of Cape Coast on December 19, 1959.

During the late 1950s, he also studied the native and controversial custom of pouring libations on important occasions. Amissah explained that before Church leaders determine if this practice is good or bad, they must understand what villagers intend when they pour a libation.

He died at age 68 and is buried at the St. Francis de Sales Cathedral in Cape Coast, Ghana.

References

External links
Catholic-Hierarchy
"Black Bishops" - TIME Magazine

1922 births
1991 deaths
Participants in the Second Vatican Council
20th-century Roman Catholic archbishops in Ghana
Roman Catholic bishops of Cape Coast
Roman Catholic archbishops of Cape Coast
Ghanaian expatriates in Italy